Garber may refer to:

People

Places 
In the United States
 Garber, Iowa, a city
 Garber, Missouri, an unincorporated community
 Garber, Oklahoma, a city

Other 
 3076 Garber, a Main Belt asteroid
 Garber High School, a public high school in Essexville, Michigan
 Garber House (disambiguation), several places
 Paul E. Garber Preservation, Restoration, and Storage Facility, a restoration and storage facility for the Smithsonian Institution's National Air and Space Museum

See also 
 Garver (disambiguation)